Kim Chang-soo (Hangul : 김창수, ; born 12 September 1985) is a South Korean footballer who currently plays as righy back for Incheon United.

International career
On 1 February 2009, he played at first senior level game for South Korea against Syria national football team.

He was part of the South Korean team that won a bronze medal at the 2012 Summer Olympics.

Kim appeared for South Korea in two qualifying matches for the 2014 FIFA World Cup. He was selected to the 23-man squad for the final tournament in Brazil, but did not appear in any matches as Lee Yong started all three of South Korea's matches at right-back.

Career statistics

Club

Honours
Jeonbuk Hyundai Motors
AFC Champions League: 2016

Ulsan Hyundai
Korean FA Cup: 2017

South Korea U23
Summer Olympics bronze medal: 2012

South Korea
AFC Asian Cup runner-up: 2015

Individual
K League 1 Best XI: 2012

References

External links

Kim Chang-soo at KFA 
 

1985 births
Living people
Association football fullbacks
South Korean footballers
South Korean expatriate footballers
South Korea international footballers
Ulsan Hyundai FC players
Daejeon Hana Citizen FC players
Busan IPark players
Kashiwa Reysol players
Jeonbuk Hyundai Motors players
K League 1 players
J1 League players
Expatriate footballers in Japan
South Korean expatriate sportspeople in Japan
Footballers at the 2008 Summer Olympics
Footballers at the 2012 Summer Olympics
Olympic footballers of South Korea
Olympic medalists in football
Olympic bronze medalists for South Korea
Medalists at the 2012 Summer Olympics
2014 FIFA World Cup players
2015 AFC Asian Cup players
People from Yeosu
Sportspeople from South Jeolla Province